Family with sequence similarity 170 member B is a protein that in humans is encoded by the FAM170B gene.

References

Further reading